Ithente Neethi is a 1987 Malayalam-language Indian feature film, directed by J. Sasikumar for Sreelakshmi Creations, starring Shankar in the lead role, supported by Balan K. Nair, Rajya Lakshmi and Shari playing other important roles. It is a remake of the Kannada film Thaliya Bhagya.

Plot 

Ithente Neethi is the story of a faithful dog and his love for his master, who was brutally killed by the villain. The film is the tale of revenge done by the dog on his master's killers.

Cast 

Shankar
Rajya Lakshmi
Shari
Jose
Balan K. Nair
Bahadoor
V. N. Raj
Kuthiravattam Pappu

Soundtrack 
The music was composed by Johnson and the lyrics were written by Poovachal Khader.

References

External links 
 

1987 films
1980s Malayalam-language films
Malayalam remakes of Kannada films
Films directed by J. Sasikumar